Henry Borwin may refer to:

 Henry Borwin I, Lord of Mecklenburg (died 1227), reigned 1178 to 1219
 Henry Borwin II, Lord of Mecklenburg (1170–1226), reigned 1219 to 1226
 Henry Borwin III, Lord of Rostock (c. 1220–1278), reigned 1226 to 1234 (jointly) and 1234 to 1278 (alone)